Hermógenes Pérez de Arce Ibieta (born 10 January 1936) is a Chilean lawyer and politician who served as deputy during Salvador Allende's government. In his country, he is commonly known for being a fierce supporter of Augusto Pinochet's dictatorship. More precisely, he is known for being a leading deanialist of the human rights violations in Pinochet's Chile.

For long time Hermógenes Pérez de Arce was a regular columnist in El Mercurio.
He is also a writer and has written several books.
In 2003 he was homaged in Casa Piedra by hard-line Pinochetists for "rescuing the historical truth of Chile".

In December 2019 Pérez de Arce was expelled from the TV program Bienvenidos by hostress Tonka Tomicic for his repeated denialist comments. Subsequently, Senator Alejandro Navarro proposed a Chilean law against denialism dubbed "Ley Hermógenes".

See also
 Sergio Diez, another denialist of human rights violations of the Pinochet regime

References

External links
 BCN Profile

1936 births
People from Santiago
Living people
National Party (Chile, 1966) politicians
University of Chile alumni
20th-century Chilean politicians
21st-century Chilean politicians
Chilean anti-communists